Acting for a Cause is a live read series of classic plays and screenplays created, produced, directed and hosted by Brando Crawford. The script is typically announced days before the event alongside a playbill featuring the cast and an animation on Instagram.  The actors have one rehearsal ahead of time. Each reading is organized to raise money for charity. The readings garnered over 500,000 viewers between the first play read on March 27, 2020 and the last announced read on July 31, 2020.

The series has featured young Hollywood actors such as Florence Pugh, Margaret Qualley, Ruby Rose, Madelaine Petsch, Zazie Beetz, David Corenswet, Jacob Elordi, Natalia Dyer, Corbin Bleu, Julia Fox, Tommy Dorfman, Madeline Brewer, Sophia Lillis, Wyatt Oleff, Cameron Monaghan. Recurring participants include  Auliʻi Cravalho, Brandon Flynn, Justice Smith, Alex Wolff, Ronen Rubinstein, Jessica Frances Dukes, Mason Alexander Park, Sydney Lemmon, and Xxavier Lavell. While Brando Crawford serves as director and producer for every reading. Alex Wolff co-produced the reading of "This is our Youth", and Xxavier Lavell co-directed the reading of "Hit the Wall".

The reading series was a direct response to the pandemic and launched Brando Crawford's career as a director and producer.

Readings 
Brando Crawford directs and reads the stage directions unless otherwise noted.  Many of the actors play multiple supporting roles.  Specific roles are stated only when information is known.

2020

March 27, 2020 
The Importance of Being Earnest by Oscar Wilde

Directed and produced by Brando Crawford
 Justice Smith as Jack
 Alex Wolff as Algernon
 Auliʻi Cravalho as Gwendolen
 Jessica Frances Dukes as Cecily
 Sarah Ramos as Lady Bracknell
 Odessa Young as Lady Prism
 Jessica Carlson as Lane
 Brando Crawford as the Master of Ceremonies
Note: This cast originally included Diana Silvers but she was unavailable at the last minute.

April 10, 2020 
This Is Our Youth by Kenneth Lonergan

Directed and produced by Brando Crawford, co-produced by Alex Wolff
 Florence Pugh as Jessica Goldman
 Justice Smith as Dennis Ziegler
 Alex Wolff as Warren Straub
 Brando Crawford as the Master of Ceremonies

April 24, 2020 
Hamlet by William Shakespeare

Directed and produced by Brando Crawford
 Willa Fitzgerald as Hamlet
 Brandon Flynn as Ophelia
 Madeline Brewer as Claudius
 Hari Nef as Polonius
 Auliʻi Cravalho as Laertes
 Ronen Rubinstein as Horatio
 Mason Alexander Park as Rosencrantz
 Christopher Collins as Guildenstern
 Chandler Lovelle as King Hamlet's Ghost
 Brando Crawford as Queen Gertrude and the Master of Ceremonies

May 1, 2020 
Romeo and Juliet by William Shakespeare

Directed and produced by Brando Crawford
 Margaret Qualley as Juliet
 David Corenswet as Romeo
 Brandon Flynn as Mercutio
 Skylar Astin as Tybalt
 Michael Gandolfini as Benvolio
 Jackie Cruz as Lady Capulet
 Kathryn Gallagher as Friar Lawrence
 Erin Sanders as Nurse
 Samuel H. Levine as Tybalt
 Will Hochman as Lord Montague
 Brando Crawford as Lord Capulet and the Master of Ceremonies

May 8, 2020 
Pride and Prejudice by Jane Austen

Directed and produced by Brando Crawford
 Melissa Barrera as Elizabeth Bennet
 Jacob Elordi as Mr. Darcy
 Madelaine Petsch as Jane Bennet
 Sam Corlett as Mr. Bingley
 Sydney Lemmon as Mrs. Bennet
 Andy Allo as Kitty Bennet, Caroline Bingley
 Katherine McNamara as Lydia Bennet
 Lexi Underwood as Mary Bennet
 Ronen Rubinstein as Mr. Collins
 Daniel Newman as Mr. Wickham
 Auliʻi Cravalho as Lady Catherine
 Matthew Postlethwaite as Sir William
 Brando Crawford as Mr. Bennet and Master of Ceremonies

May 15, 2020 
Jane Eyre by Charlotte Brontë

Directed and produced by Brando Crawford
 Natalia Dyer as Jane Eyre
 Alexander Hodge as Mr. Edward Rochester
 Sophia Lillis as Helen Burns
 Elle Loraine as Mrs. Fairfax
 Sydney Lemmon as Bertha
 Richard Ellis as St. John Rivers
 Jessica Frances Dukes as Mrs. Reed
 Rudy Pankow as Brocklehurst
 Brando Crawford as the Master of Ceremonies

May 22, 2020 
Twelfth Night by William Shakespeare

Directed and produced by Brando Crawford
 Ruby Rose as Viola
 Brandon Thomas Lee as Duke Orsino
 Taylor Trensch as Sebastian
 Froy Gutierrez as Sir Andrew Aguecheek
 Ben Levi Ross as Feste
 Will Roland as Malvolio
 Maitreyi Ramakrishnan as Olivia
 Nicole Kang as Maria
 Brando Crawford as Sir Toby Belch and the Master of Ceremonies

June 23, 2020 
Hit the Wall by Ike Holter

Directed and produced by Brando Crawford
 Ryan Jamaal Swain as A-Gay
 Angel Bismark Curiel as Newbie
 Daniel Kyri as Mika
 Eve Lindley as Peg
 Clark Moore as Cliff
 Dilone as Roberta
 Jan Luis Castellanos as Tano
 Travis Bryant as Carson
 Imani Hakim as Madeline
 Xxavier Lavell as Narrator and Co-Director
 Brando Crawford as the Cop and the Master of Ceremonies

June 30, 2020 
Up in the Air by Jason Reitman and Sheldon Turner

Directed and produced by Brando Crawford
 Zazie Beetz as Natalie Keener (originally played by Anna Kendrick)
 Pom Klementieff as Alex Goran (originally played by Vera Farmiga)
 Michael Zegen as Ryan Bingham (originally played by George Clooney)
 Corbin Bleu as Craig Gregory (originally played by Jason Bateman)
 Jessica Parker Kennedy as Kara Bingham (originally played by Amy Morton)
 Benjamin Barrett as Jim Miller (originally played by Danny McBride) and Steve (originally played by Zach Galifianakis)
 Mason Alexander Park as Bob (originally played by J. K. Simmons) and Maynard Finch (originally played by Sam Elliott)
 Zoey Burger as Julie Bingham (originally played by Melanie Lynskey)
 Brando Crawford as Master of Ceremonies

July 7, 2020 
Ferris Bueller's Day Off by John Hughes

Directed and produced by Brando Crawford
 Cameron Monaghan as Ferris Bueller (originally played by Matthew Broderick)
 Brando Crawford as Cameron Frye (originally played by Alan Ruck) and as Boy in Police Station (originally played Charlie Sheen)
 Emeraude Toubia as Sloane Peterson (originally played by Mia Sara)
 Charlie Weber as Rooney (originally played by Jeffrey Jones) and as Economics Teacher (originally played by Ben Stein)
 Auliʻi Cravalho as Jeannie Bueller (originally played by Jennifer Grey)
 Jeanine Mason as Grace (originally played by Edie McClurg)
 Xxavier Lavell as Narrator

Note: This cast originally included Kelvin Harrison Jr. but he was unavailable at the last minute.

July 31, 2020 
A Midsummer Night's Dream by William Shakespeare

Directed and produced by Brando Crawford
 Brando Crawford as Bottom the Weaver, Egeus, and Master of Ceremonies
 Tommy Dorfman as Puck (also plays Quince – this script has them being the same person; as if Puck has disguised himself as Quince entirely)
 Julia Fox as Hippolyta (also plays Titania)
 Andrew Matarazzo as Theseus (also plays Oberon)
 Erinn Westbrook as Hermia
 Pauline Chalamet as Helena
 Drew Starkey as Demetrius
 Wyatt Oleff as Lysander
 Lauren McCrostie as Mustardseed/Snug/Lion
 Paris De Chantal Smith as Cobweb/Starveling/Moon and Philostrate
 Alyssa Jirrels as Narrator/Snout/Wall
 Ashleigh Morghan as Peaseblossom/Flute/Thisbe

Other events 
On June 5, 2020, Brando Crawford, Xxavier Lavell, and Daniel Wilson uploaded the Black Lives Matter Manifesto on Acting for a Cause's YouTube channel unannounced, in place of a reading.

References

External links 
 
 

Screenplays
Charity events
Cultural responses to the COVID-19 pandemic
Impact of the COVID-19 pandemic on the performing arts